Mahishasura Mardini (a name for Durga) is a 1959 Indian Kannada-language film, directed and produced by B. S. Ranga. The film stars Rajkumar, V. Nagayya, Udaykumar and Narasimharaju. It was dubbed in seven other languages and is retrospectively identified as amongst the first major Pan-India films.

The film has musical score by G. K. Venkatesh. It was dubbed in seven languages - including in Telugu under the same name  and in Hindi as Durga Maata (1960). This was the first movie shot in Vikram Studios, Madras. Rajkumar sang a duet as a playback singer for the first time through the song Thumbithu Manava in this movie.

Cast 

Rajkumar as Mahishasura
Sowcar Janaki as Gunavathi
V. Nagayya as Shukracharya
Udaykumar as Rambhesha
Narasimharaju as Vyaaghrasimha
K. S. Ashwath as Narada
Rajanala
Ganapathi Bhat
Sandhya as Chamundeshwari
T. D. Kusalakumari
Suryakala
Indrani as Goddess Durga
M. Lakshmidevi
Vasudeva Girimaji
Hanumantha Rao
Suryakumar
Udayashankar as Vishnu
Sadashivaiah
Rajendra Krishna
Y. N. S. Swamy
Rangaswamy
Papamma
Shanthamma

Soundtrack 
The music was composed by G. K. Venkatesh.

References

External links 

 
 

1950s Kannada-language films
Films scored by G. K. Venkatesh
Hindu mythological films